Thrincophora dryinodes is a moth of the  family Tortricidae. It is found in Australia (including Victoria, the Australian Capital Territory and New South Wales).

References

Moths described in 1910
Archipini